67 Ophiuchi (67 Oph) is a class B5 Ib (blue supergiant) star in the constellation Ophiuchus. Its apparent magnitude is 3.93 and it is approximately 1200 light years away based on parallax. It is considered to be a member of the open cluster Collinder 359 (Melotte 186).

67 Oph has four companions. The closest is a magnitude 13.7 B1 main sequence star at 8.29", designated B. Component C (BD+02°3459) is the brightest close companion, a magnitude 8.1 B2 main sequence star at 54.32".  Component D is a magnitude 12.5 star 8.37" from component C. Component E is a magnitude 10.9 star 46.53" from 67 Oph A.

References

Further reading

 

Ophiuchus (constellation)
B-type supergiants
BD+02 3458
Ophiuchi, 67
088192
6714
164353
B-type main-sequence stars